The 2014–15 season of FC Barcelona Bàsquet is the 51st season of the basketball club in the highest division of Spanish basketball and the 24th season in the Liga ACB.

Roster

Transactions

In

|}

Out

Euroleague

| valign=top width=50% |

Top 16

|}
|}

Quarterfinals

References

Barcelona
 
Barcelona